FlyNordic was an airline based in Stockholm, Sweden. It operated scheduled and charter services in Scandinavia and Europe. Its main base was Stockholm-Arlanda Airport, Stockholm. In 2007 the airline was bought by Norwegian Air Shuttle and became a fully integrated part of the latter.

History 
Originally established as Reguljair in 1996, the airline operated domestic services with an Embraer EMB 110 Bandeirante. Its operating licence was revoked on 14 November 2000, and it relaunched in December as Nordic East. Finnair acquired the company in 2003 and 2004, establishing a new subsidiary, Nordic Airlink Holding, and rebranding as FlyNordic. FlyNordic bankrupted in 2005, while Nordic Airlink Holding was reorganised and took up the FlyNordic name.

On 24 April 2007, Norwegian Air Shuttle announced that they had bought 100% of the FlyNordic shares from Finnair. This made Norwegian Scandinavia's largest low-cost airline. As a result of Finnair's ownership in FlyNordic, Finnair owned 5% of Norwegian Air Shuttle.

On 14 March 2008, Norwegian Air Shuttle announced that FlyNordic would be re-branded Norwegian after 5 April 2008 in order to strengthen and unify the brand. This ended the story of FlyNordic.

Destinations 
FlyNordic operated the following services (at March 2008): 
Bosnia and Herzegovina
Sarajevo (Sarajevo International Airport)
Croatia
Dubrovnik (Dubrovnik Airport)
Split (Split Airport)
Denmark
Copenhagen (Copenhagen Airport)
Estonia
Tallinn (Lennart Meri Tallinn Airport) [seasonal]
France
Bordeaux (Aéroport de Bordeaux Mérignac)
Nice (Côte d'Azur International Airport)
Paris (Orly Airport)
Italy
Alghero (Fertilia Airport) [seasonal]
Ireland
Dublin (Dublin Airport) [seasonal]
Norway
Bergen (Bergen Airport, Flesland) [seasonal]
Oslo (Oslo Airport, Gardermoen)
Poland
Kraków (John Paul II International Airport)
Warsaw (Frederic Chopin Airport)
Serbia
Belgrade (Belgrade Nikola Tesla Airport)
Spain
Alicante (Alicante Airport)
Málaga (Málaga Airport)
Sweden
Kiruna (Kiruna Airport)
Luleå (Luleå Airport)
Malmö (Malmö Airport)
Östersund (Åre Östersund Airport)
Stockholm (Stockholm-Arlanda Airport)
Umeå (Umeå Airport)
Switzerland
Geneva (Geneva Cointrin International Airport)
Turkey
Istanbul (Sabiha Gökçen Airport)

Fleet 
The flyNordic fleet included the following aircraft (at January 2008):

See also
 Airlines
 Transport in Sweden

References

External links

FlyNordic (archive)
FlyNordic (archive) 
FlyNordic fleet
"Finnair acquires controlling interest in Nordic Airlink." Finnair Group. 19 August 2003.
"Norwegian Air Shuttle to acquire 100% of FlyNordic." Norwegian Air Shuttle. 24 April 2007.

Defunct airlines of Sweden
Defunct European low-cost airlines
Airlines established in 1996
Airlines disestablished in 2008
Finnair
Norwegian Air Shuttle